"Re-Align" is a single by the rock band Godsmack. It reached number three on the Mainstream Rock chart and number twenty eight on the Modern Rock chart in the United States. The single was released in its album form, but was also used to promote upcoming-at-the-time acoustic EP The Other Side.

Song meaning
According to Sully Erna, the song is about how every time he tours to New Orleans with Godsmack, he gets sick. Erna attributes this to having been killed in New Orleans in a previous life and being haunted by "evil spirits" every time he visits New Orleans.

Versions
There are two versions of "Re-Align". The original version appeared on Godsmack's third studio album, Faceless. The second version, which is an acoustic recording, appeared on The Other Side EP. Although the two versions have a similar sound, the acoustic version runs for 4:23, three seconds longer than the original version. The acoustic version is, naturally, a bit softer.

Chart positions

References

2003 singles
2002 songs
Godsmack songs
Song recordings produced by David Bottrill
Songs written by Sully Erna
Universal Music Group singles